Polyphemus is a Cyclops in Greek mythology. The name "Polyphemus" may also refer to:
Polyphemus (Argonaut), another figure from Greek mythology
Antheraea polyphemus, or Polyphemus moth, a giant silk moth of North America
Polyphemus (crustacean), a genus of cladocerans
Limulus polyphemus, the Atlantic horseshoe crab
Polyphemus (book), a collection of short stories by Michael Shea
Polyphemus (Reni), a 1639–1640 painting by Guido Reni
Polyphemus (sculpture), an 1888 bronze by Auguste Rodin
Polifemo, an Italian opera by Nicola Porpora
The name of the gas giant in the Avatar series, which Pandora orbits.

See also
HMS Polyphemus, the name of several ships of the British Royal Navy
Polyphem (missile), a cancelled surface-to-surface missile project
Polyphemus#Possible origins, for folktales similar to that of Homer's Polyphemus